Kepler-37d is an extrasolar planet (exoplanet) discovered by the Kepler space telescope in February 2013. It is located 209 light years away, in the constellation Lyra. With an orbital period of 29 days, it is the largest of the three known planets orbiting its parent star Kepler-37.

See also
List of planets discovered by the Kepler spacecraft

References

Exoplanets discovered in 2013
37d
Lyra (constellation)
Terrestrial planets
Transiting exoplanets
Kepler-37